John I (died 1007) was the duke of Amalfi (1004–1007) and prince of Salerno (981–983). He was the son of Manso I. His father associated him in the principality of Salerno, but their rule was unpopular and they were overthrown by John II. John inherited Amalfi on his father's death and ruled a short three years.

References
Caravale, Mario (ed). Dizionario Biografico degli Italiani: LV Ginammi – Giovanni da Crema. Rome, 2000.

1007 deaths
John I
Princes of Salerno
10th-century Lombard people
11th-century Lombard people
Year of birth unknown